Bucculatrix eucalypti is a moth of the family Bucculatricidae. It was described in 1880 by Edward Meyrick and is found in Australia.

The larvae feed on Eucalyptus species. They feed on the underside of the leaves, eroding the surface of the leaf. They pupate in a longitudinally ribbed cocoon.

External links
Australian Faunal Directory

Moths of Australia
Bucculatricidae
Moths described in 1880
Taxa named by Edward Meyrick